Dean Kelly may refer to:

 Dean Kelly (footballer) (born 1985), Irish footballer
 Dean Kelly (artist) (born 1977), Irish painter and photographer
 Dean Lennox Kelly (born 1975), English actor